The 1999 Railway Cup Hurling Championship was the 71st staging of the Railway Cup since its establishment by the Gaelic Athletic Association in 1927. The cup began on 7 November 1999 and ended on 21 November 1999.

Leinster were the defending champions, however, they were beaten by Connacht in the semi-final.

On 21 November 1999, Connacht won the cup after a 2-13 to 1–15 defeat of Munster in the final at Semple Stadium. This was their 10th Railway Cup title overall and their first title since 1994.

Results

Semi-finals

Final

Bibliography

 Donegan, Des, The Complete Handbook of Gaelic Games (DBA Publications Limited, 2005).

References

Railway Cup Hurling Championship
Railway Cup Hurling Championship
Hurling